Purple gallinule is an alternative name for two species of birds in the rail family. It can refer to:

 Purple swamphen, a group of closely related species of swamphen of the Old World
 American purple gallinule, Porphyrio martinicus of the New World

Birds by common name